Marnan Bridge is a historical bridge in Isfahan, Iran. The current structure of the bridge dates back to the Safavid era, but its foundations are older and possibly as old as the Shahrestan bridge, which dates back to the Sasanian era

References

External links 

Bridges in Isfahan